The Beardstown Infants were a minor league baseball team based in Beardstown, Illinois. In 1909 and 1910, the Infants played as members of the  Class D level Illinois-Missouri League, hosting home games at Schmoldt Park.

History
In 1909, the Beardstown Infants then became members of the Class D level Illinois-Missouri League. Joining Beardstown in the six–team league were the Canton Chinks, Galesburg Boosters, Macomb Potters, Monmouth Browns and Pekin Celestials. Pekin and Beardstown were new franchises for the league, replacing the Hannibal Cannibals and Havana Perfectos.

The "Infants" nickname was in reference to the team being a new team and a youthful team.

In their first season of play, the 1909 Beardstown Infants finished as the runner–up in the Illinois–Missouri League. With a regular season record of 77–52, Beardstown placed 2nd in the six–team Illinois–Missouri League standings, playing under manager Harry Riggons. Beardstown finished 1.0 game behind the 1st place Monmouth Browns in the final league standings.

Beardstown's Andy Lotshaw led the 1909 Illinois–Missouri League with a .329 average, 146 hits, 14 triples and 72 runs scored. Beardstown had 20–game winners in Merle Spaide (23–9), Cecil Weisenberger (21–14) and C.E. Pettit (20–11).

The 1910 Beardstown Infants relocated before the end of the Illinois–Missouri League season. When the Class D level Northern Association folded on July 19, 1910, Jacksonville was left without a team. The Beardstown Infants filled the vacancy and moved to Jacksonville, Illinois on July 21, 1910 with a 38–26 record. The Jacksonville Jacks resumed play and the team had an overall record of 44–36 in the Illinois–Missouri League when the franchise folded on August 17, 1910. The Macomb Potters disbanded from the Illinois–Missouri League on the same day. The 1910 Beardstown/Jacksonville managers were Jack Corbett and Pants Rowland.

Manager Jack Corbett is credited with inventing the modern bases with base stems that are now used in baseball. Corbett's name is still incorporated into the logo on major league bases. Pants Rowland later managed the Chicago White Sox to the 1917 World Series Championship. Rowland may have managed the 1910 team only upon relocating to Jacksonville.

The 1910 Beardstown Infants were the last minor league team hosted in Beardstown, Illinois.

The ballpark
The Beardstown Infants played home games at Schmoldt Park. The park is still in use today as a public park with baseball fields. The ballpark was located at North Bay & Wall Streets, Beardstown, Illinois.

Timeline

Year-by-year records

Notable alumni

Fred Kommers (1909)
Moxie Meixell (1910)
Pants Rowland (1910, MGR)

See also
Beardstown Infants players

References

External links
Beardstown - Baseball Reference
1909 team photo

Defunct minor league baseball teams
Professional baseball teams in Illinois
Defunct baseball teams in Illinois
Baseball teams established in 1909
Baseball teams disestablished in 1910
Illinois-Missouri League teams
Cass County, Illinois